The 39th Infantry Regiment is a parent regiment in the United States Army. Originally organized for service in World War I, the 39th fought in most of the conflicts involving the United States during the 20th century, and since 1990 the 2nd Battalion has served as a training unit stationed at Fort Jackson, South Carolina. The 3rd Battalion was started on 21 October 2015 and a 4th Battalion was added in July 2017.

Other units called "39th Infantry Regiment"
There was a 39th United States Infantry raised in Tennessee for service in the War of 1812. In 1815, after that war ended, the 39th was consolidated with the 8th and 24th Regiments to form the 7th Infantry Regiment.

In the 1866 reorganization of the Regular Army after the American Civil War, Congress authorized a 39th Infantry Regiment, one of four so-called "Colored Troops" regiments with African-American enlisted men and white officers. The Army was reduced in size in 1869, and the 39th and 40th were consolidated into the 25th Infantry Regiment.

History
The 39th Infantry Regiment was organized at Camp Syracuse, New York on 1 June 1917 by transfer of veteran troops from the 30th Infantry Regiment.

World War I
In December 1917, the 39th was assigned to the 4th Infantry Division and in the spring of 1918, sailed for France as part of the American Expeditionary Force in World War I. Its service in this war earned the regiment its nickname "Fighting Falcons".

Between wars
During the lull between wars, the regimental crest was designed and approved. The shield is blue for infantry. The fleur-de-lis is from the coat of arms of Soissons, a town in France recaptured by the 39th Regiment in 1918. The two trees represent the Groves of Cresnes, the site of the regiment's first military success in France during World War I. The boar's head on the canton is taken from the crest of the 30th Infantry Regiment and indicates the 39th was organized with personnel from the 30th Infantry Regiment. The crest is a falcon's head, for Mount Faucon in Meuse-Argonne. The falcon holds an ivy leaf in its bill, in recognition of the shoulder sleeve insignia of the 4th Infantry Division to which the regiment was assigned during World War I. The motto "D'une Vaillance Admirable" is a quotation from the French citation which awarded the Croix De Guerre with Gilt Star to the regiment for its distinguished service in World War I. The motto best translates - "With a Military Courage Worthy of Admiration".

World War II
During World War II the regiment fought as part of the 9th Infantry Division. The Fighting Falcons of the 39th became the first unit of United States combat troops to set foot on foreign soil when they stormed the beaches of Algiers in November 1942. During fighting in Sicily, Italy, the regiment came under the command of Colonel Harry A. "Paddy" Flint who gave the regiment its triple A- Bar Nothing slogan: Anything, Anywhere, Anytime - Bar Nothing. The regiment took great pride in the AAA-O slogan, displaying it on their helmets and vehicles, even in combat. When questioned about the soundness of the practice, Colonel Flint said, "The enemy who sees our regiment in combat, if they live through the battle, will know to run the next time they see us coming." General George Patton said of Colonel Flint: "Paddy Flint is clearly nuts, but he fights well." On 31 July 1943, while temporarily attached to the 1st Infantry Division), the 39th suffered its first serious reverse at the battle of Troina, when entrenched and heavily armed German forces repelled an assault by the 39th Infantry Regiment with heavy casualties.

Later in the war, the 39th landed at Utah Beach on 10 June 1944 (D+4) with other reinforcing units and then fought through the rugged French countryside. Colonel Flint was killed six weeks after the regiment entered combat. The regiment joined the 47th Infantry Regiment in capturing Roetgen, the first German town to fall in World War II. The 39th fought through the Battle of the Bulge, helped secure the Remagen bridgehead and moved across Germany as the allied forces finished off the last of the German resistance. In the war the 39th Regiment received campaign streamers from battles in Algeria, Tunisia, Sicily, Normandy, Northern France, The Rhineland, Ardennes-Alsace, and Central Europe. It was cited twice by the Belgians for valorous actions and awarded the Belgian Fourragère. It also received two French Croix de Guerre with Palm, the French Fourragère, and three Presidential Unit Citations.

Vietnam

After a series of inactivations and activations spanning a 20-year period, the 2nd, 3rd and 4th Battalions, 39th Infantry Regiment were reactivated on 1 February 1966 as part of the 9th Infantry Division at Fort Riley, Kansas. The 39th deployed in 1966 with the 9th Infantry Division to the Republic of Vietnam. The regiment participated in operation Palm Tree, the 1968 Tet Offensive, and the battle of the Plain of Reeds. When the 39th Infantry Regiment returned to Hawaii and deactivated in September, 1969, its battle streamers now included Counteroffensive Phase II, Counteroffensive Phase III, TET Counteroffensive, Counteroffensive Phase IV, Counteroffensive Phase V, Counteroffensive Phase VI, TET 69 Counteroffensive, and Summer-Fall 1969. The battalions had also received three Republic of Vietnam Crosses of Gallantry with Palm, the Republic of Vietnam Civil Action Medal, First Class, two Valorous Unit Awards and its fourth Presidential Unit Citation.

Then-Lieutenant Colonel David Hackworth commanded the 4th Battalion, 39th Infantry, in Vietnam.

Post-Vietnam
When the 9th Infantry Division was again reconstituted around 1972, this time at Fort Lewis, Washington, it was established again with the 2nd and the 3rd Battalions 39th Infantry (the 1st Battalion was serving with the 8th Infantry Division in Baumholder, Germany.) It remained a part of the active Army in the 9th Division until the "Old Reliables" were again deactivated around 1991.

Following reactivation and transfer to the Training and Doctrine Command, the 2d and 4th Battalions - IET, BCT -, 39th Infantry Regiment departed Fort Dix, New Jersey for Fort Jackson, South Carolina, arriving on 22 August 1990. 4th Battalion 39th Infantry was reactivated in October 2017 at Fort Jackson. The battalions conduct Basic Combat Training, and are part of the 165th Infantry Brigade at Fort Jackson, organized with a headquarters company and six line (training) companies, designated A through E.

Awards and recognitions

Unit citations
For its part in World Wars I, II and the Vietnam War, the 39th Infantry Regiment possesses 21 battle streamers. Its decorations include four Presidential Unit Citations, four French Croix de Guerre (two with Palm and one with Gilt Star), and the Belgian Fourageré.

Presidential Unit Citation (Army), Streamer embroidered, Contentin Peninsula (1st Battalion)
Presidential Unit Citation (Army), Streamer embroidered, Cherence Le Roussel (1st Battalion)
Presidential Unit Citation (Army), Streamer embroidered, Le Desert (2d Battalion)
Presidential Unit Citation (Army), Streamer embroidered, Ding Tuong Province (2d Battalion)
Valorous Unit Award, Streamer embroidered, Ben Tre City, (2d and 3d Battalions {less Companies A, D and E})
Valorous Unit Award, Streamer embroidered, Saigon (3d and 4th Battalions)
French Croix de Guerre with Gold Star, World War I, Streamer embroidered, Aisne-Marne
Belgian Fourragere, 1940
Cited in the Order of the Day of the Belgian Army for action on the Meuse River
Cited in the Order of the Day of the Belgian Army for action in the Ardennes

Medals of Honor
Four soldiers received the U.S. Medal of Honor while serving with the 39th Infantry.
Peter J. Dalessondro - Company E - World War II
Edward A. DeVore, Jr. - Company B, 4th Battalion - Vietnam
Don J. Jenkins - Company A, 2d Battalion - Vietnam
David P. Nash - Company B, 2d Battalion - Vietnam

Campaign streamers

World War I

Aisne-Marne
St. Mihiel
Meuse-Argonne
Champagne 1918
Lorraine 1918

World War II

Algeria-French Morocco
Tunisia
Sicily
Normandy
Northern France
Rhineland
Ardennes-Alsace
Central Europe

Vietnam

Counteroffensive, Phase II
Counteroffensive, Phase III
Tet Counteroffensive
Counteroffensive, Phase IV
Counteroffensive, Phase V
Counteroffensive, Phase VI
Tet 69/Counteroffensive
Summer-Fall 1969

Notes

External links
39th Infantry Regiment in WWII
"Paddy" Flint's biography on the web site of the Arlington National Cemetery
1/39 INF Web Beacon
Home of Echo Company, 2/39 INF (Vietnam)
39th INF (Vietnam)
39th INF Unit Histories in 9th Division (Vietnam)

0039
Military units and formations established in 1917
Infantry regiments of the United States Army in World War II
United States Army regiments of World War I
Military units and formations of the United States Army in the Vietnam War